The 1963 Penn State Nittany Lions football team represented Pennsylvania State University in the 1963 NCAA University Division football season. Led by fourteenth-year head coach Rip Engle, the Nittany Lions were 7–3 and were 16th in the final coaches' poll.  Home games were played on campus at Beaver Stadium in University Park; Penn State was independent in football until 1993.

The Nittany Lions were led on the field in 1963 by fifth-year senior quarterback Pete Liske, who had been selected in the NFL and AFL drafts the previous December and went on to play a dozen seasons in pro football. The regular season finale against rival Pittsburgh was postponed two weeks following the assassination of President Kennedy.

Schedule

References

Penn State
Penn State Nittany Lions football seasons
enn State Nittany Lions football